Aquello que amamos  (English language:Those that We Loved) is a 1959  Argentine film directed and written by Leopoldo Torres Ríos. The film premiered on 20 August 1959 in Buenos Aires and starred Lautaro Murúa and Aída Luz.

Other Cast
 Ana Casares
 Luis María Galó as Luisito Nuñez
 Carlos Gómez as Osvaldo
 Roberto Leidet as Andrés Nuñez
 Pablo Moret
 Mario Morets
 Oscar Orlegui
 Lagos Osvaldo as Médico
 Sarita Rudoy as Adela
 María Elena Spaducci as Clarita Nuñez

External links
 

1959 films
1950s Spanish-language films
Argentine black-and-white films
Films directed by Leopoldo Torres Ríos
1950s Argentine films